The 2020–21 FIS Snowboard World Cup was the 27th World Cup season in snowboarding organised by International Ski Federation. The season started on 12 December 2020 and  concluded on 28 March 2021. Competitions consisted of parallel slalom, parallel giant slalom, snowboard cross, halfpipe, slopestyle and big air.

Men

Snowboard Cross

Parallel

Halfpipe

Slopestyle

Big Air

Ladies

Snowboard Cross

Parallel

Halfpipe

Slopestyle

Big Air

Team

Parallel mixed

Men's standings

Parallel overall (PSL/PGS)

Parallel slalom

Parallel giant slalom

Snowboard Cross

Freestyle overall (BA/SS/HP)

Halfpipe

Slopestyle

Big Air

Ladies' standings

Parallel overall (PSL/PGS)

Parallel slalom

Parallel giant slalom

Snowboard Cross

Freestyle overall (BA/SS/HP)

Halfpipe

Slopestyle

Big Air

Team

Parallel Team

Nations Cup

Overall

References 

FIS Snowboard World Cup
FIS Snowboard World Cup
FIS Snowboard World Cup